NGC 7640 is a barred spiral galaxy in the constellation of Andromeda. Discovered on October 17, 1786 by the English astronomer William Herschel, NGC 7640 is an 11th magnitude barred spiral galaxy. Also known as LEDA 71220, UGC 12554 and IRAS 23197+4034, this galaxy is located in the constellation Andromeda, 38.8 million light-years from Earth. Galaxies of this type are recognizable by their spiral arms, which fan out not from a circular core, but from an elongated bar cutting through the galaxy’s centre. NGC 7640 might not look much like a spiral, but this is due to the orientation of the galaxy with respect to an observer on Earth. There is evidence that this galaxy has experienced an interaction with another galaxy in the (astronomically) recent past.

It is not immediately obvious this is a spiral galaxy from the photograph because it is edge on.

References

External links 
 

Andromeda (constellation)
7640
Barred spiral galaxies